The 1997 Toronto Blue Jays season was the franchise's 21st season of Major League Baseball. It resulted in the Blue Jays finishing fifth in the American League East with a record of 76 wins and 86 losses.  With a massive redesign of their logos and uniforms, the Blue Jays attempted to re-establish themselves in the American League East by signing Roger Clemens via free agency and bringing All-Stars Carlos García and Orlando Merced through trade. Although Clemens rejuvenated himself with the Blue Jays (en route to one of the best-ever single seasons by a starting pitcher, winning the Cy Young Award and the pitchers' triple crown), both Garcia and Merced ended up being flops as dismal overall hitting and an inconsistent bullpen doomed the Blue Jays once again to a last-place finish. 1997 also marked the end of the road for manager Cito Gaston, being fired near the end of the season (Gaston would eventually return to the team in 2008). Longtime fan-favourite Joe Carter also played in his final season for the Blue Jays, as he was released at the end of the season.

Offseason
October 2, 1996: Dane Johnson was selected off waivers by the Oakland Athletics from the Toronto Blue Jays.
 November 14, 1996: Dan Plesac was traded by the Pittsburgh Pirates with Carlos Garcia and Orlando Merced to the Toronto Blue Jays for players to be named later, José Silva, Brandon Cromer (minors), and Jose Pett (minors). The Toronto Blue Jays sent Mike Halperin (minors) (December 11, 1996), Abraham Nunez (December 11, 1996), and Craig Wilson (December 11, 1996) to the Pittsburgh Pirates to complete the trade.
November 27, 1996: Jeff Ware was selected off waivers by the Milwaukee Brewers from the Toronto Blue Jays.
 December 9, 1996: Benito Santiago signed as a free agent with the Toronto Blue Jays.
 December 13, 1996: Roger Clemens  signed as a free agent with the Toronto Blue Jays.
December 18, 1996: Juan Samuel was signed as a free agent with the Toronto Blue Jays.
 December 20, 1996: John Olerud was traded by the Toronto Blue Jays with cash to the New York Mets for Robert Person.

Regular season

Opening Day starters
Joe Carter
Carlos Delgado
Carlos Garcia
Alex Gonzalez
Shawn Green
Pat Hentgen
Orlando Merced
Otis Nixon
Benito Santiago
Ed Sprague

Interleague Play
June 30 – The first interleague game between the Montreal Expos and the Toronto Blue Jays took place at the SkyDome. The Expos won the game by a score of 2-1.

Expos vs. Jays
June 30, SkyDome, Toronto, Ontario

Batting

Pitching

Canada Day Game
The Blue Jays and Expos played to a sold-out Skydome crowd on Canada Day. Legendary Roger Clemens would get the start as the Blue Jays donned red uniforms for the second time. Montreal pitcher Jeff Juden would have a no-hitter through the first six innings until Shawn Green would hit a dramatic home run to break Juden's bid for a no-hitter.

Season standings

Record vs. opponents

Notable transactions
May 11, 1997: Rubén Sierra was signed as a free agent with the Toronto Blue Jays.
June 3, 1997: Orlando Hudson was drafted by the Toronto Blue Jays in the 43rd round of the 1997 amateur draft. Player signed May 20, 1998.
June 5, 1997: Ryan Thompson was traded by the Cleveland Indians to the Toronto Blue Jays for Jeff Manto.
June 16, 1997: Rubén Sierra was released by the Toronto Blue Jays.
July 25, 1997: Omar Daal was selected off waivers by the Toronto Blue Jays from the Montreal Expos.
July 29, 1997: Mariano Duncan was traded by the New York Yankees with cash to the Toronto Blue Jays for Angel Ramirez (minors).
July 31, 1997: Paul Spoljaric was traded by the Toronto Blue Jays with Mike Timlin to the Seattle Mariners for Jose Cruz.
August 8, 1997: Tilson Brito was selected off waivers by the Oakland Athletics from the Toronto Blue Jays.
August 12, 1997: Otis Nixon was traded by the Toronto Blue Jays to the Los Angeles Dodgers for Bobby Cripps (minors).

Roster

Game log

|- align="center" bgcolor="ffbbbb"
| 1 || April 1 || White Sox || 6 – 5 (10) || Castillo (1-0) || Plesac (0-1) || Hernández (1) || 40,299 || 0-1
|- align="center" bgcolor="bbffbb"
| 2 || April 2 || White Sox || 6 – 1 || Clemens (1-0) || Álvarez (0-1) || || 31,310 || 1-1
|- align="center" bgcolor="bbffbb"
| 3 || April 4 || Brewers || 6 – 2 || Guzmán (1-0) || Karl (0-1) || Crabtree (1) || 26,331 || 2-1
|- align="center" bgcolor="ffbbbb"
| 4 || April 5 || Brewers || 5 – 2 || McAndrew (1-0) || Williams (0-1) || Jones (1) || 31,226 || 2-2
|- align="center" bgcolor="ffbbbb"
| 5 || April 6 || Brewers || 4 – 2 || McDonald (1-1) || Hentgen (0-1) || Jones (2) || 29,106 || 2-3
|- align="center" bgcolor="bbbbbb"
| -- || April 8 || @ White Sox || colspan=6|Postponed (cold weather) Rescheduled for August 19
|- align="center" bgcolor="bbffbb"
| 6 || April 9 || @ White Sox || 5 – 0 || Clemens (2-0) || Álvarez (0-2) || || 746 || 3-3
|- align="center" bgcolor="bbffbb"
| 7 || April 10 || @ White Sox || 4 – 0 || Guzmán (2-0) || Baldwin (0-1) || || 14,180 || 4-3
|- align="center" bgcolor="bbbbbb"
| -- || April 11 || @ Brewers || colspan=6|Postponed (snow) Rescheduled for July 28
|- align="center" bgcolor="bbbbbb"
| -- || April 12 || @ Brewers || colspan=6|Postponed (snow) Rescheduled for July 29
|- align="center" bgcolor="ffbbbb"
| 8 || April 13 || @ Brewers || 3 – 2 || Wickman (1-0) || Crabtree (0-1) || || 19,143 || 4-4
|- align="center" bgcolor="ffbbbb"
| 9 || April 14 || Royals || 3 – 2 || Rusch (2-0) || Quantrill (0-1) || Pichardo (2) || 25,642 || 4-5
|- align="center" bgcolor="ffbbbb"
| 10 || April 15 || Royals || 7 – 5 || Rosado (1-0) || Guzmán (2-1) || Pichardo (3) || 25,582 || 4-6
|- align="center" bgcolor="bbffbb"
| 11 || April 16 || Athletics || 4 – 3 || Crabtree (1-1) || Taylor (0-1) || || 26,139 || 5-6
|- align="center" bgcolor="bbffbb"
| 12 || April 17 || Athletics || 5 – 4 || Quantrill (1-1) || Groom (0-1) || Timlin (1) || 25,625 || 6-6
|- align="center" bgcolor="bbffbb"
| 13 || April 18 || @ Rangers || 6 – 5 || Hentgen (1-1) || Pavlik (1-2) || Timlin (2) || 30,452 || 7-6
|- align="center" bgcolor="bbffbb"
| 14 || April 19 || @ Rangers || 6 – 0 || Clemens (3-0) || Hill (1-2) || || 44,206 || 8-6
|- align="center" bgcolor="ffbbbb"
| 15 || April 20 || @ Rangers || 10 – 5|| Witt (3-0) || Guzmán (2-2) || || 34,333 || 8-7
|- align="center" bgcolor="ffbbbb"
| 16 || April 21 || @ Angels || 5 – 4 (13) || DeLucia (1-0) || Spoljaric (0-1)  || || 13,413 || 8-8
|- align="center" bgcolor="bbffbb"
| 17 || April 22 || @ Angels || 7 – 6 || Quantrill (2-1) || James (1-2) || Plesac (1) || 13,353 || 9-8
|- align="center" bgcolor="ffbbbb"
| 18 || April 23 || @ Angels || 5 – 4 (10) || DeLucia (2-0) || Spoljaric (0-2)  || || 13,117 || 9-9
|- align="center" bgcolor="ffbbbb"
| 19 || April 25 || Mariners || 13 – 8 || Ayala (2-0) || Plesac (0-2) || || 31,215 || 9-10
|- align="center" bgcolor="bbffbb"
| 20 || April 26 || Mariners || 4 – 3 || Quantrill (3-1) || Lowe (0-1) || || 31,420 || 10-10
|- align="center" bgcolor="ffbbbb"
| 21 || April 27 || Mariners || 2 – 1 || Johnson (3-0) || Person (0-1) || Charlton (7) || 32,160 || 10-11
|- align="center" bgcolor="ffbbbb"
| 22 || April 29 || @ Royals || 6 – 5 (10)|| Pichardo (1-0) || Quantrill (3-2) || || 12,533 || 10-12
|- align="center" bgcolor="bbffbb"
| 23 || April 30 || @ Royals || 1 – 0 || Clemens (4-0) || Appier (3-1) || Spoljaric (1) || 13,004 || 11-12
|-

|- align="center" bgcolor="ffbbbb"
| 24 || May 1 || @ Royals || 8 – 0 || Rosado (2-0) || Williams (0-2) || || 12,046 || 11-13
|- align="center" bgcolor="ffbbbb"
| 25 || May 2 || Twins || 3 – 2 (10)|| Radke (2-1) || Crabtree (1-2) || Aguilera (5) || 30,226 || 11-14
|- align="center" bgcolor="bbffbb"
| 26 || May 3 || Twins || 6 – 5 || Quantrill (4-2) || Ritchie (2-3) || || 29,150 || 12-14
|- align="center" bgcolor="bbffbb"
| 27 || May 4 || Twins || 1 – 0 || Hentgen (2-1) || Tewksbury (1-5) || || 29,114 || 13-14
|- align="center" bgcolor="bbffbb"
| 28 || May 5 || Tigers || 3 – 1 || Clemens (5-0) || Olivares (1-2) || || 27,169 || 14-14
|- align="center" bgcolor="bbffbb"
| 29 || May 6 || Tigers || 2 – 1 (10)|| Crabtree (2-2) || Jones (1-2) || || 26,294 || 15-14
|- align="center" bgcolor="ffbbbb"
| 30 || May 7 || @ Indians || 7 – 1 || McDowell (3-2) || Person (0-2) || || 42,463 || 15-15
|- align="center" bgcolor="bbffbb"
| 31 || May 8 || @ Indians || 4 – 3 || Guzmán (3-2) || Ogea (2-3) || Quantrill (1) || 42,567 || 16-15
|- align="center" bgcolor="bbffbb"
| 32 || May 9 || @ Twins || 4 – 1 || Hentgen (3-1) || Rodriguez (1-3) || Timlin (3) || 13,277 || 17-15
|- align="center" bgcolor="bbffbb"
| 33 || May 10 || @ Twins || 6 – 4 || Clemens (6-0) || Swindell (2-2) || Crabtree (2) || 20,932 || 18-15
|- align="center" bgcolor="bbffbb"
| 34 || May 11 || @ Twins || 3 – 2 || Williams (1-2) || Aldred (1-5) || Timlin (4) || 32,552 || 19-15
|- align="center" bgcolor="ffbbbb"
| 35 || May 12 || @ Twins || 12 – 2 || Radke (3-2) || Carpenter (0-1) || || 10,830 || 19-16
|- align="center" bgcolor="ffbbbb"
| 36 || May 13 || @ Tigers || 4 – 0 || Lira (2-2) || Guzmán (3-3) || || 9,992 || 19-17
|- align="center" bgcolor="bbffbb"
| 37 || May 14 || @ Tigers || 7 – 2 || Hentgen (4-1) || Moehler (2-3) || || 11,788 || 20-17
|- align="center" bgcolor="bbffbb"
| 38 || May 16 || Indians || 5 – 2 || Clemens (7-0) || Hershiser (3-2) || Timlin (5) || 35,195 || 21-17
|- align="center" bgcolor="ffbbbb"
| 39 || May 17 || Indians || 8 – 1 || Lopez (1-2) || Williams (1-3) || || 36,220 || 21-18
|- align="center" bgcolor="ffbbbb"
| 40 || May 18 || Indians || 8 – 6 || Ogea (4-3) || Carpenter (0-2) || Jackson (4) || 31,137 || 21-19
|- align="center" bgcolor="bbffbb"
| 41 || May 20 || @ Yankees || 2 – 0 || Hentgen (5-1) || Pettitte (6-2) || || 20,220 || 22-19
|- align="center" bgcolor="bbffbb"
| 42 || May 21 || @ Yankees || 4 – 1 || Clemens (8-0) || Rogers (3-2) || || 19,863 || 23-19
|- align="center" bgcolor="ffbbbb"
| 43 || May 23 || Angels || 12 – 2 || Springer (3-1) || Guzmán (3-4) || || 30,209 || 23-20
|- align="center" bgcolor="ffbbbb"
| 44 || May 24 || Angels || 3 – 1 || Watson (2-3) || Williams (1-4) || Percival (2) || 28,351 || 23-21
|- align="center" bgcolor="bbffbb"
| 45 || May 25 || Angels || 4 – 3 (11)|| Timlin (1-0) || DeLucia (4-2) || || 28,180 || 24-21
|- align="center" bgcolor="bbffbb"
| 46 || May 26 || Rangers || 8 – 1 || Clemens (9-0) || Santana (2-2) || || 28,113 || 25-21
|- align="center" bgcolor="ffbbbb"
| 47 || May 27 || Rangers || 15 – 5 || Burkett (4-3) || Person (0-3) || || 28,126 || 25-22
|- align="center" bgcolor="ffbbbb"
| 48 || May 28 || Yankees || 6 – 4 || Wells (5-3) || Guzmán (3-5) || Rivera (15) || 32,338 || 25-23
|- align="center" bgcolor="ffbbbb"
| 49 || May 29 || Yankees || 4 – 0 || Cone (6-3) || Williams (1-5) || Nelson (1) || 43,155 || 25-24
|- align="center" bgcolor="ffbbbb"
| 50 || May 30 || @ Athletics || 12 – 7 || Prieto (4-3) || Hentgen (5-2) || || 11,004 || 25-25
|- align="center" bgcolor="bbffbb"
| 51 || May 31 || @ Athletics || 13 – 3 || Clemens (10-0) || Telgheder (1-3) || || 15,027 || 26-25
|-

|- align="center" bgcolor="ffbbbb"
| 52 || June 1 || @ Athletics || 8 – 2 || Oquist (1-1) || Person (0-4) || || 21,127 || 26-26
|- align="center" bgcolor="ffbbbb"
| 53 || June 2 || @ Mariners || 3 – 0 || Johnson (8-1) || Andújar (0-1) || || 40,312 || 26-27
|- align="center" bgcolor="ffbbbb"
| 54 || June 3 || @ Mariners || 6 – 3 || Moyer (5-2) || Williams (1-6) || || 28,786 || 26-28
|- align="center" bgcolor="ffbbbb"
| 55 || June 5 || Athletics || 4 – 3 || Reyes (1-0) || Hentgen (5-3) || Taylor (10) || 30,189 || 26-29
|- align="center" bgcolor="bbffbb"
| 56 || June 6 || Athletics || 4 – 1 || Clemens (11-0) || Oquist (1-2) || Quantrill (2) || 32,208 || 27-29
|- align="center" bgcolor="bbffbb"
| 57 || June 7 || Athletics || 3 – 1 || Person (1-4) || Karsay (1-7) || Quantrill (3) || 28,490 || 28-29
|- align="center" bgcolor="ffbbbb"
| 58 || June 8 || Athletics || 7 – 5 || Wengert (3-3) || Andújar (0-2) || Taylor (11) || 29,404 || 28-30
|- align="center" bgcolor="bbffbb"
| 59 || June 10 || Mariners || 8 – 3 || Hentgen (6-3) || Sanders (2-6) || || 33,124 || 29-30
|- align="center" bgcolor="ffbbbb"
| 60 || June 11 || Mariners || 5 – 1 || Fassero (6-2) || Clemens (11-1) || || 41,099 || 29-31
|- align="center" bgcolor="ffbbbb"
| 61 || June 13 || @ Phillies || 4 – 3 || Gomes (1-0) || Spoljaric (0-3) || Bottalico (14) || 26,799 || 29-32
|- align="center" bgcolor="bbffbb"
| 62 || June 14 || @ Phillies || 3 – 2 || Person (2-4) || Nye (0-2) || Quantrill (4) || 22,582 || 30-32
|- align="center" bgcolor="bbffbb"
| 63 || June 15 || @ Phillies || 11 – 1 || Hentgen (7-3) || Leiter (4-7) || || 30,516 || 31-32
|- align="center" bgcolor="ffbbbb"
| 64 || June 16 || Braves || 3 – 0 || Neagle (10-1) || Clemens (11-2) || || 34,409 || 31-33
|- align="center" bgcolor="ffbbbb"
| 65 || June 17 || Braves || 8 – 7 || Maddux (8-3) || Andújar (0-3) || Wohlers (14) || 31,356 || 31-34
|- align="center" bgcolor="bbffbb"
| 66 || June 18 || Braves || 5 – 3 || Williams (2-6) || Smoltz (6-6) || Timlin (6) || 31,717 || 32-34
|- align="center" bgcolor="bbffbb"
| 67 || June 20 || Orioles || 3 – 0 || Hentgen (8-3) || Mussina (8-2) || || 30,266 || 33-34
|- align="center" bgcolor="ffbbbb"
| 68 || June 21 || Orioles || 5 – 1 || Erickson (10-2) || Plesac (0-3) || || 40,139 || 33-35
|- align="center" bgcolor="ffbbbb"
| 69 || June 22 || Orioles || 5 – 2 || Kamieniecki (6-3) || Person (2-5) || Myers (25) || 35,106 || 33-36
|- align="center" bgcolor="ffbbbb"
| 70 || June 23 || Red Sox || 7 – 6 || Sele (9-5) || Williams (2-7) || Slocumb (8) || 30,380 || 33-37
|- align="center" bgcolor="ffbbbb"
| 71 || June 24 || Red Sox || 9 – 6 || Wasdin (2-3) || Andújar (0-4) || Slocumb (9) || 27,263 || 33-38
|- align="center" bgcolor="ffbbbb"
| 72 || June 25 || Red Sox || 13 – 12 || Wakefield (3-7) || Hentgen (8-4) || Slocumb (10) || 27,605 || 33-39
|- align="center" bgcolor="bbffbb"
| 73 || June 26 || @ Orioles || 3 – 0 || Clemens (12-2) || Erickson (10-3) || Timlin (7) || 47,617 || 34-39
|- align="center" bgcolor="bbffbb"
| 74 || June 27 || @ Orioles || 2 – 1 || Person (3-5) || Kamieniecki (6-4) || Spoljaric (2) || 47,900 || 35-39
|- align="center" bgcolor="bbffbb"
| 75 || June 28 || @ Orioles || 5 – 2 || Williams (3-7) || Key (11-4) || Timlin (8) || 47,687 || 36-39
|- align="center" bgcolor="bbffbb"
| 76 || June 29 || @ Orioles || 3 – 2 || Escobar (1-0) || Benítez (0-3) || Timlin (9) || 47,763 || 37-39
|- align="center" bgcolor="ffbbbb"
| 77 || June 30 || Expos || 2 – 1 || Martínez (10-3) || Hentgen (8-5) || || 37,430 || 37-40
|-

|- align="center" bgcolor="ffbbbb"
| 78 || July 1 || Expos || 2 – 1 || Juden (10-2) || Clemens (12-3) || Urbina (15) || 50,436 || 37-41
|- align="center" bgcolor="bbffbb"
| 79 || July 2 || Expos || 7 – 6 (13)|| Timlin (2-0) || Telford (2-2) || || 34,176 || 38-41
|- align="center" bgcolor="ffbbbb"
| 80 || July 3 || Yankees || 3 – 1 || Wells (9-4) || Williams (3-8) || Rivera (27) || 31,227 || 38-42
|- align="center" bgcolor="bbffbb"
| 81 || July 4 || Yankees || 1 – 0 || Escobar (2-0) || Cone (8-4) || || 34,134 || 39-42
|- align="center" bgcolor="ffbbbb"
| 82 || July 5 || Yankees || 8 – 0 || Pettitte (9-5) || Hentgen (8-6) || || 44,206 || 39-43
|- align="center" bgcolor="bbffbb"
| 83 || July 6 || Yankees || 2 – 0 || Clemens (13-3) || Mendoza (3-4) || || 41,137 || 40-43
|- align="center" bgcolor="ffbbbb"
| 84 || July 10 || @ Red Sox || 8 – 7 (11)|| Eshelman (3-3) || Timlin (2-1) || || 30,913 || 40-44
|- align="center" bgcolor="bbffbb"
| 85 || July 11 || @ Red Sox || 8 – 4 || Hentgen (9-6) || Wasdin (3-4) || || 32,543 || 41-44
|- align="center" bgcolor="bbffbb"
| 86 || July 12 || @ Red Sox || 3 – 1 || Clemens (14-3) || Sele (10-7) || Spoljaric (3) || 33,106 || 42-44
|- align="center" bgcolor="bbffbb"
| 87 || July 13 || @ Red Sox || 3 – 2 || Williams (4-8) || Wakefield (3-10) || Escobar (1) || 32,418 || 43-44
|- align="center" bgcolor="ffbbbb"
| 88 || July 14 || @ Orioles || 9 – 5 || Mathews (2-1) || Person (3-6) || || 47,042 || 43-45
|- align="center" bgcolor="ffbbbb"
| 89 || July 15 || @ Orioles || 8 – 4 || Boskie (5-3) || Guzmán (3-6) || || 47,062 || 43-46
|- align="center" bgcolor="ffbbbb"
| 90 || July 16 || @ Rangers || 6 – 0 || Oliver (6-9) || Hentgen (9-7) || || 45,313 || 43-47
|- align="center" bgcolor="bbffbb"
| 91 || July 17 || @ Rangers || 9 – 1 || Clemens (15-3) || Burkett (7-8) || || 46,239 || 44-47
|- align="center" bgcolor="bbffbb"
| 92 || July 18 || @ Angels || 2 – 1 || Williams (5-8) || Watson (8-6) || Escobar (2) || 26,087 || 45-47
|- align="center" bgcolor="ffbbbb"
| 93 || July 19 || @ Angels || 5 – 4 || Percival (4-4) || Timlin (2-2) || || 28,288 || 45-48
|- align="center" bgcolor="ffbbbb"
| 94 || July 20 || @ Angels || 9 – 5 || Finley (8-6) || Andújar (0-5) || || 19,671 || 45-49
|- align="center" bgcolor="bbffbb"
| 95 || July 22 || Brewers || 5 – 2 || Hentgen (10-7) || Eldred (9-10) || Escobar (3) || 33,181 || 46-49
|- align="center" bgcolor="bbffbb"
| 96 || July 23 || Brewers || 8 – 0 || Clemens (16-3) || McAndrew (1-1) || || 31,580 || 47-49
|- align="center" bgcolor="bbffbb"
| 97 || July 24 || Brewers || 5 – 4 || Williams (6-8) || Mercedes (3-6) || Escobar (4) || 30,114 || 48-49
|- align="center" bgcolor="bbffbb"
| 98 || July 25 || Royals || 2 – 1 || Person (4-6) || Rusch (3-6) || Escobar (5) || 31,308 || 49-49
|- align="center" bgcolor="bbffbb"
| 99 || July 26 || Royals || 6 – 5 || Timlin (3-2) || Carrasco (0-1) || || 34,133 || 50-49
|- align="center" bgcolor="ffbbbb"
| 100 || July 27 || Royals || 3 – 2 || Olson (1-0) || Quantrill (4-3) || || 32,341 || 50-50
|- align="center" bgcolor="ffbbbb"
| 101 || July 28 || @ Brewers || 1 – 0 || Woodard (1-0) || Clemens (16-4) || Fetters (3) || || 50-51
|- align="center" bgcolor="ffbbbb"
| 102 || July 28 || @ Brewers || 9 – 3 || Adamson (3-1) || Flener (0-1) || || 18,034 || 50-52
|- align="center" bgcolor="ffbbbb"
| 103 || July 29 || @ Brewers || 2 – 0 || Mercedes (4-6) || Williams (6-9) || Fetters (4) || 22,549 || 50-53
|- align="center" bgcolor="ffbbbb"
| 104 || July 29 || @ Brewers || 4 – 2 || Karl (6-10) || Carpenter (0-3) || Fetters (5) || 12,237 || 50-54
|- align="center" bgcolor="ffbbbb"
| 105 || July 31 || @ Tigers || 4 – 2 || Thompson (9-8) || Person (4-7) || Jones (19) || 16,294 || 50-55
|-

|- align="center" bgcolor="bbffbb"
| 106 || August 1 || @ Tigers || 7 – 5 || Hentgen (11-7) || Miceli (2-2) || Escobar (6) || 23,682 || 51-55
|- align="center" bgcolor="ffbbbb"
| 107 || August 2 || @ Tigers || 8 – 7 || Brocail (3-4) || Quantrill (4-4) || Jones (20) || 22,254 || 51-56
|- align="center" bgcolor="ffbbbb"
| 108 || August 3 || @ Tigers || 5 – 2 || Blair (11-4) || Williams (6-10) || Jones (21) || 27,848 || 51-57
|- align="center" bgcolor="ffbbbb"
| 109 || August 4 || @ Twins || 9 – 3 || Radke (16-5) || Carpenter (0-4) || || 19,018 || 51-58
|- align="center" bgcolor="bbffbb"
| 110 || August 5 || @ Twins || 8 – 3 || Person (5-7) || Miller (0-2) || || 17,920 || 52-58
|- align="center" bgcolor="bbffbb"
| 111 || August 6 || Indians || 6 – 3 || Hentgen (12-7) || Lopez (3-5) || Escobar (7) || 36,463 || 53-58
|- align="center" bgcolor="bbffbb"
| 112 || August 7 || Indians || 4 – 0 || Clemens (17-4) || Smiley (1-1) || || 35,194 || 54-58
|- align="center" bgcolor="bbffbb"
| 113 || August 8 || Tigers || 6 – 3 || Williams (7-10) || Blair (11-5) || Escobar (8) || 30,228 || 55-58
|- align="center" bgcolor="ffbbbb"
| 114 || August 9 || Tigers || 3 – 2 || Sanders (4-9) || Carpenter (0-5) || Jones (23) || 37,166 || 55-59
|- align="center" bgcolor="ffbbbb"
| 115 || August 10 || Tigers || 4 – 2 || Thompson (11-8) || Person (5-8) || || 32,354 || 55-60
|- align="center" bgcolor="bbffbb"
| 116 || August 11 || Tigers || 8 – 2 || Hentgen (13-7) || Jarvis (0-2) || || 30,105 || 56-60
|- align="center" bgcolor="bbffbb"
| 117 || August 12 || Twins || 9 – 1 || Clemens (18-4) || Bowers (0-2) || || 33,108 || 57-60
|- align="center" bgcolor="bbffbb"
| 118 || August 13 || Twins || 3 – 2 || Quantrill (5-4) || Trombley (1-2) || || 31,292 || 58-60
|- align="center" bgcolor="ffbbbb"
| 119 || August 15 || @ Indians || 5 – 4 (10)|| Assenmacher (4-0) || Crabtree (2-3) || || 43,011 || 58-61
|- align="center" bgcolor="ffbbbb"
| 120 || August 16 || @ Indians || 8 – 4 || Shuey (3-1) || Quantrill (5-5) || || 42,908 || 58-62
|- align="center" bgcolor="bbffbb"
| 121 || August 17 || @ Indians || 10 – 5 || Clemens (19-4) || Wright (3-2) || || 42,861 || 59-62
|- align="center" bgcolor="ffbbbb"
| 122 || August 18 || @ Indians || 5 – 3 || Hershiser (11-5) || Williams (7-11) || Mesa (6) || 42,471 || 59-63
|- align="center" bgcolor="bbffbb"
| 123 || August 19 || @ White Sox || 6 – 5 || Carpenter (1-5) || Cruz (0-1) || Escobar (9) || || 60-63
|- align="center" bgcolor="ffbbbb"
| 124 || August 19 || @ White Sox || 5 – 3 || Bere (1-0) || Andújar (0-6) || Karchner (7) || 19,643 || 60-64
|- align="center" bgcolor="ffbbbb"
| 125 || August 20 || @ White Sox || 12 – 6 || Baldwin (9-13) || Person (5-9) || || 20,003 || 60-65
|- align="center" bgcolor="ffbbbb"
| 126 || August 21 || @ White Sox || 6 – 3 || Drabek (10-8) || Hentgen (13-8) || Karchner (8) || 20,120 || 60-66
|- align="center" bgcolor="bbffbb"
| 127 || August 22 || @ Royals || 5 – 3 || Clemens (20-4) || Rosado (8-10) || Escobar (10) || 29,604 || 61-66
|- align="center" bgcolor="bbffbb"
| 128 || August 23 || @ Royals || 6 – 5 || Janzen (1-0) || Walker (3-3) || Quantrill (5) || 19,249 || 62-66
|- align="center" bgcolor="bbffbb"
| 129 || August 24 || @ Royals || 11 – 8 (13)|| Crabtree (3-3) || Casian (0-2) || || 14,434 || 63-66
|- align="center" bgcolor="ffbbbb"
| 130 || August 26 || White Sox || 8 – 5 || Baldwin (10-13) || Williams (7-12) || Karchner (10) || 31,198 || 63-67
|- align="center" bgcolor="bbffbb"
| 131 || August 27 || White Sox || 13 – 2 || Hentgen (14-8) || Drabek (10-9) || || 30,219 || 64-67
|- align="center" bgcolor="bbffbb"
| 132 || August 28 || White Sox || 3 – 2 (11)|| Quantrill (6-5) || McElroy (0-3) || || 36,181 || 65-67
|- align="center" bgcolor="ffbbbb"
| 133 || August 29 || Marlins || 8 – 0 || Leiter (9-9) || Person (5-10) || || 29,223 || 65-68
|- align="center" bgcolor="ffbbbb"
| 134 || August 30 || Marlins || 4 – 1 || Fernandez (17-9) || Carpenter (1-6) || Nen (32) || 35,229 || 65-69
|- align="center" bgcolor="ffbbbb"
| 135 || August 31 || Marlins || 8 – 3 || Hernández (9-0) || Williams (7-13) || || 31,125 || 65-70
|-

|- align="center" bgcolor="ffbbbb"
| 136 || September 1 || @ Mets || 3 – 0 || Isringhausen (2-0) || Hentgen (14-9) || Franco (34) || 19,196 || 65-71
|- align="center" bgcolor="ffbbbb"
| 137 || September 2 || @ Mets || 8 – 5 || Acevedo (2-1) || Clemens (20-5) || Wendell (5) || 17,635 || 65-72
|- align="center" bgcolor="ffbbbb"
| 138 || September 3 || @ Mets || 4 – 2 || Mlicki (7-10) || Quantrill (6-6) || Franco (35) || 14,513 || 65-73
|- align="center" bgcolor="ffbbbb"
| 139 || September 4 || Rangers || 6 – 2 || Helling (2-1) || Carpenter (1-7) || || 26,178 || 65-74
|- align="center" bgcolor="bbffbb"
| 140 || September 5 || Rangers || 5 – 1 || Williams (8-13) || Pavlik (2-4) || || 27,121 || 66-74
|- align="center" bgcolor="bbffbb"
| 141 || September 6 || Rangers || 2 – 1 || Hentgen (15-9) || Burkett (7-12) || Escobar (11) || 31,232 || 67-74
|- align="center" bgcolor="bbffbb"
| 142 || September 7 || Rangers || 4 – 0 || Clemens (21-5) || Oliver (11-11) || || 30,212 || 68-74
|- align="center" bgcolor="bbffbb"
| 143 || September 8 || Angels || 12 – 10 || Plesac (1-3) || James (4-5) || Escobar (12) || 25,775 || 69-74
|- align="center" bgcolor="bbffbb"
| 144 || September 9 || Angels || 2 – 0 || Carpenter (2-7) || Hill (7-12) || || 25,674 || 70-74
|- align="center" bgcolor="ffbbbb"
| 145 || September 10 || @ Athletics || 3 – 2 || Mathews (5-2) || Plesac (1-4) || || 4,764 || 70-75
|- align="center" bgcolor="ffbbbb"
| 146 || September 11 || @ Athletics || 8 – 7 || Mathews (6-2) || Escobar (2-1) || || 6,135 || 70-76
|- align="center" bgcolor="ffbbbb"
| 147 || September 12 || @ Mariners || 7 – 3 || Ayala (10-4) || Clemens (21-6) || || 37,044 || 70-77
|- align="center" bgcolor="bbffbb"
| 148 || September 13 || @ Mariners || 6 – 3 || Escobar (3-1) || Ayala (10-5) || || 51,631 || 71-77
|- align="center" bgcolor="ffbbbb"
| 149 || September 14 || @ Mariners || 3 – 2 || Timlin (6-4) || Risley (0-1) || Slocumb (24) || 45,477 || 71-78
|- align="center" bgcolor="ffbbbb"
| 150 || September 15 || @ Mariners || 7 – 3 || Cloude (3-2) || Williams (8-14) || Slocumb (25) || 41,684 || 71-79
|- align="center" bgcolor="ffbbbb"
| 151 || September 17 || @ Red Sox || 4 – 3 || Mahay (3-0) || Quantrill (6-7) || Gordon (9) || 23,648 || 71-80
|- align="center" bgcolor="ffbbbb"
| 152 || September 18 || @ Red Sox || 3 – 2 || Corsi (4-2) || Escobar (3-2) || || 27,990 || 71-81
|- align="center" bgcolor="bbffbb"
| 153 || September 19 || @ Yankees || 3 – 0 || Daal (1-0) || Gooden (8-5) || Escobar (13) || 31,195 || 72-81
|- align="center" bgcolor="ffbbbb"
| 154 || September 20 || @ Yankees || 4 – 3 (11)|| Banks (3-0) || Janzen (1-1) || || 38,332 || 72-82
|- align="center" bgcolor="ffbbbb"
| 155 || September 21 || @ Yankees || 5 – 4 (10)|| Boehringer (3-2) || Almanzar (0-1) || || 40,038 || 72-83
|- align="center" bgcolor="ffbbbb"
| 156 || September 22 || @ Yankees || 8 – 1 || Wells (15-10) || Hentgen (15-10) || || 23,380 || 72-84
|- align="center" bgcolor="ffbbbb"
| 157 || September 23 || Orioles || 3 – 2 || Rodríguez (2-1) || Clemens (21-7) || Myers (44) || 29,276 || 72-85
|- align="center" bgcolor="ffbbbb"
| 158 || September 24 || Orioles || 9 – 3 || Kamieniecki (10-6) || Daal (1-1) || || 27,443 || 72-86
|- align="center" bgcolor="bbffbb"
| 159 || September 25 || Orioles || 4 – 3 || Carpenter (3-7) || Mussina (15-8) || Escobar (14) || 28,324 || 73-86
|- align="center" bgcolor="bbffbb"
| 160 || September 26 || Red Sox || 3 – 0 || Williams (9-14) || Henry (7-3) || || 34,155 || 74-86
|- align="center" bgcolor="bbffbb"
| 161 || September 27 || Red Sox || 12 – 5 || Janzen (2-1) || Corsi (5-3) || || 37,401 || 75-86
|- align="center" bgcolor="bbffbb"
| 162 || September 28 || Red Sox || 3 – 2 || Plesac (2-4) || Gordon (6-10) || || 40,251 || 76-86
|-

Player stats

Batting
Note: Pos = Position; G = Games played; AB = At bats; H = Hits; HR = Home runs; RBI = Runs batted in; Avg. = Batting average

Other batters
Note: G = Games; AB = At bats; H = Hits; HR = Home runs; RBI = Runs batted in; Avg. = Batting average

Starting pitchers
Note: G = Games pitched; IP = Innings pitched; W = Wins; L = Losses; ERA = Earned run average; SO = Strikeouts

Other pitchers
Note: G = Games; IP = Innings pitched; W = Wins; L = Losses; ERA = Earned run average; SO = Strikeouts

Relief pitchers
Note: G = Games pitched; W = Wins; L = Losses; SV = Saves; ERA = Earned run average; SO = Strikeouts

Award winners
Roger Clemens, Pitcher of the Month Award, May
Roger Clemens, Pitcher of the Month Award, August
Roger Clemens, Cy Young Award
Roger Clemens, MLB Leader, 21 Wins
Roger Clemens, AL Strikeout Crown, 292 Strikeouts
Roger Clemens, AL ERA Crown, 2.05
Roger Clemens, American League Leader, Complete Games (9)
Roger Clemens, American League Leader, Shutouts (3)
Roger Clemens, American League Leader, Innings Pitched (264)

All-Star Game
 Roger Clemens, P
 Pat Hentgen, P

Farm system

References

External links
1997 Toronto Blue Jays at Baseball Reference
1997 Toronto Blue Jays at Baseball Almanac

Toronto Blue Jays seasons
1997 in Canadian sports
Toronto BLue Jays
1997 in Toronto